Samuel Lloyd Tickle (born 31 March 2002) is an English professional footballer who plays as an goalkeeper for Warrington Rylands on loan from Wigan Athletic.

Professional career
Tickle is a youth product of Wigan Athletic, having joined their youth academy in 2012. He was released at the end of the 2018 season as he was deemed too short for his age. He signed for Pilkington FC in the Cheshire League Premier Division & played a major part in them finishing 2018-19 Champions. During the 2018-19 season he was also selected as the No1 for England Schoolboys FA & represented his country making 5 appearances, conceding only once. In 2019 he was then re-signed & given a Scholarship back at Wigan Athletic F.C.   He made his professional debut with Wigan in a 2–0 EFL Trophy loss to Crewe Alexandra on 5 October 2021.

On 19 March 2022, Tickle joined Northern Premier League Premier Division side Nantwich Town on a youth loan until 14 April 2022.

In July 2022, he joined Northern Premier League side Warrington Rylands on loan until January 2023. He made two appearances for the club, but was recalled by Wigan following an injury to first-choice goalkeeper Ben Amos. He was named on the bench against Birmingham City on 20 August 2022 & against Huddersfield on 13 September 2022. He returned to Warrington Rylands on loan until January, but after 4 appearances was recalled again  due to injuries to Jones & then Amos. He was named on the bench against Hull  City F.C. on 5th Oct 2022 & for the consecutive 10 games.

References

External links
 

2002 births
Living people
Footballers from Warrington
English footballers
Wigan Athletic F.C. players
Nantwich Town F.C. players
Association football goalkeepers